Saint-Florentin is a commune in the Yonne department in Bourgogne-Franche-Comté in north-central France. It lies at the confluence of the rivers Armançon and Armance, and on the Canal de Bourgogne.

Twin towns
Saint-Florentin is twinned with Zeltingen-Rachtig, Rhineland-Palatinate, Germany.

See also
Communes of the Yonne department

References

Communes of Yonne
Senones
Champagne (province)